By Night in Chile (Spanish title: Nocturno de Chile) is a novella  by Chilean author Roberto Bolaño,  first published in 2000. It was the first of Bolaño's novels to be published in English, with Chris Andrews's English translation, which appeared in 2003 under New Directions.

Plot summary 

The story is narrated entirely in the first person by the sick and aging Father Urrutia. Taking place over the course of a single evening, the book is the macabre, feverish monologue of a flawed man and a failed priest. Except for the final sentence, the book is written without paragraphs or line breaks. Persistently hallucinatory and defensive, the story ranges from Opus Dei to falconry to private lessons on Marxism for Pinochet and his generals directed at the unspecified reproaches of "the wizened youth."

The story begins with the lines "I am dying now, but I still have many things to say", and proceeds to describe, after a brief mention of joining the priesthood, how Father Urrutia entered the Chilean literary world under the wing of a famous, albeit fictitious, tacitly homosexual literary critic by the name of Farewell. At Farewell's estate he encounters the critic's close friend Pablo Neruda and later begins to publish literary criticism and poetry.

Not surprisingly, Urrutia's criticism (written under a pen-name) is met with more applause than his poetry and there is little if any mention of Urrutia attending to matters of the church until two individuals from a shipping company (likely undercover government operatives) send him on a trip through Europe, where he meets priest after priest engaged in falconry.

The story is also deeply political though not always overtly, and Father Urrutia seems to stand as a kind of pitiable villain for the author himself. Urrutia is chosen to teach Augusto Pinochet and his top generals about Marxism after the coup and death of President Allende. Bolaño was well known for his brazenly radical left-wing politics and was briefly jailed by Pinochet for dissent on returning to Chile in 1973, "To help build the revolution."

Indeed, the wizened youth who Urrutia is forever lashing against and defending himself from, seems to be yet another trace of Roberto Bolaño inscribing himself into his stories, while also serving as a younger Urrutia who has not compromised himself as the current narrator himself has, suggesting that Urrutia has understood since his first words to the reader that he is compromised. By the end of the story, Urrutia seems to be making a last apology directed to himself, understanding that the reason by which he has led his life is flawed.

Unlike other fantastical deathbed rants such as William Gaddis's Agapē Agape the writing style is remarkably accessible despite itself and the story of his life intact as it is woven into Chile's political history despite progressively more delirious and compromised powers of recollection. Francisco Goldman describes it as "Sublime lunacy, Goya darkness, poignant wizardly writing--the elegantly streaming consciousness of Bolaño's dying literary priest merges one Chilean's personal memories with Chilean literature and history, and ends up confronting us with devastating questions that anyone, anywhere, might, should, be asking of themselves 'right now.'"

The novella, a satire, marks the beginning of its author's criticism of artists who retreat into art, using aestheticism as a way of blocking out the harsh realities of existence. According to Ben Richards, writing in The Guardian, "Bolaño uses this to illustrate the supine nature of the Chilean literary establishment under the dictatorship."

Critical reception 
Susan Sontag declared that “By Night in Chile is the real thing, and the rarest: a contemporary novel destined to have a permanent place in world literature." James Wood from The New York Times said By Night in Chile was “still his greatest work” 

Ben Richards, writing in The Guardian, said "this is a wonderful and beautifully written book by a writer who has an enviable control over every beat, every change of tempo, every image. The prose is constantly exciting and challenging - at times lyrical and allusive, at others filled with a biting wit (Bolaño has dissected the Chilean literary tradition with such gleeful eloquence that the novel may not win him many dinner invitations back in the country of his birth)."

The Millions wrote "Bolaño’s novella is a psychological portrait of complicity, and the ways in which we rationalize our complicity."

References

External links
 "A Priest Who Lived Through the Grim Pinochet Era" by Richard Eder, The New York Times, January 16, 2004
 by Chad W. Post, The Review of Contemporary Fiction, 2004

2000 novels
Spanish-language novels
Works by Roberto Bolaño
Novels set in Chile
Editorial Anagrama books
Novels set in one day